Terry Gregson (born November 7, 1953) is a retired NHL Referee. Gregson served as the National Hockey League Director of Officiating from 2009 through 2013. He was formerly a referee in the NHL from 1979 until 2004. He wore a helmet from the mid-1980s until the end of his refereeing career. From the 1994–95 NHL season until his retirement, he wore uniform number 4, which is now worn by Wes McCauley. During his career, he refereed 1,427 regular season games, 158 playoff games, nine Stanley Cup Finals and one All-Star game. He also worked the 1996 World Cup of Hockey.

Gregson was the referee when the New York Rangers won its first Stanley Cup in 54 years in 1994, which was the highlight of his officiating career.

Gregson was also the referee for the controversial Game 6 of the 1999 Stanley Cup which was the "No Goal" game.

He was named NHL Director of Officiating on September 9, 2009. His retirement was announced August 7, 2013.

References

External links
NHL Officials Association bio on Terry Gregson

1953 births
Living people
National Hockey League officials